RPM was a Canadian magazine that published the best-performing singles of Canada from 1964 to 2000. A total of twenty singles reached number one on the RPM Singles Chart in 1992. The year began with "No Son of Mine" by Genesis at the top spot and ended with Whitney Houston's "I Will Always Love You" at the summit. Seven acts obtained their first Canadian number-one hit as either a solo or featured artist: Mr. Big, Vanessa Williams, Celine Dion, Trey Lorenz, Patty Smyth, Annie Lennox, and Alannah Myles. Genesis, U2, Elton John, and Eric Clapton each achieved two number-one singles during the year.

The best-performing single of the year in Canada was "Sometimes Love Just Ain't Enough", a duet between Patty Smyth and Don Henley, which topped the chart for seven weeks in September and October. Three Canadian acts scored a number-one single this year: Bryan Adams, Celine Dion, and Alannah Myles. Best known for her 1989 hit "Black Velvet", Myles' highest-charting song in her home country is "Song Instead of a Kiss", which topped the Canadian chart for four weeks in November and December. Celine Dion also picked up her first homeland chart-topper with "If You Asked Me To", which stayed at number one for three nonconsecutive weeks.

U2 remained at number one for six weeks with their two number-one singles—"Mysterious Ways" and "One"—while Elton John and Mr. Big each topped the chart for five weeks with their hit records. Mariah Carey and Trey Lorenz also had a five-week stint at number one with "I'll Be There", and George Michael and Madonna both logged three weeks at the summit this year.

Chart history

Notes

See also
1992 in music
RPM number-one albums of 1992

References

External links
 Read about RPM Magazine at the AV Trust
 Search RPM charts here at Library and Archives Canada

 
1992 record charts
1992